The 59th Santosh Trophy 2004 was held in Delhi from 14 October 2004 to 31 October 2004. Kerala won their fifth title beating Punjab (3-2) in the finals.

Qualifying rounds
Venues:
 Ambedkar Stadium, Delhi
 Chhatrasal Stadium, North Delhi
 Thyagaraj Sports Complex, New Delhi
Results

Cluster I

Cluster II

Cluster III

Cluster IV

Cluster V

Cluster VI

Cluster VII

Cluster VIII

Source

Quarterfinal League

Group A

Group B

Group C

Group D
Source

Semi-finals

Final

References

2004-05
2004–05 in Indian football
2004–05 domestic association football cups